Intelledox Pty Ltd was a software development company that specialized in business process digitalization. Founded in 1992.  Intelledox was acquired by Smart Communications in July 2019 and then rebranded as SmartIQ in June 2020. The Intelledox platform  was developed to address the market requirement of simplifying complex paper-based and forms-centric processes, such as onboarding, new account applications, claims and other servicing forms. Intelledox allows non-technical users to implement common Microsoft Word skills, to create reusable form fields and document components in a central repository, without the requirement of macros or coding.

Intelledox was acquired by Smart Communications  in July 2019 and maintained offices in Canberra, Sydney, Singapore, New York, Dallas, and London The company was rebranded in June 2020 as SmartIQ

Function
SmartIQ (Intelledox) customers  use the software to engage interactively with their clients, connect to legacy systems or external systems, create workflow and decisioning and ultimately create  documents such as licence applications, statements of work, claim forms, financial advice, contracts, tenders, insurance forms, customer correspondence and technical manuals. These documents can be delivered in the form of a Word or PDF document, XML file, PowerPoint presentation, Excel spreadsheet, email, SMS and more.

Technology
SmartIQ (Intelledox) is a mobile-ready business process digitalization platform built on Microsoft technology. It integrates with other line of business applications such as SharePoint, TRIM, Microsoft Dynamics and more.

By using Microsoft Word as the document designer, users have the ability to publish templates and centralize the automation and generation of documents with no scripting (IT) requirements.

SmartIQ provides a user-friendly, browser-based, front-end Wizard, which allows non-technical users to create any type of standards-compliant document.

Partnerships
Smart Communications (Intelledox) partners  with industry leaders in information management, including Microsoft (Gold level partner), Oracle (Gold level partner), Fujitsu, Sitecore and Avanade. In June 2014, Intelledox announced a new partnership with Fuji Xerox Asia Pacific, whereby Fuji Xerox will act as an authorized reseller of Intelledox to offer cloud-based electronic form and business transformation solutions in the Asia-Pacific market. In 2017 Intelledox partnered with DocuSign and is included in the DocuSign Agreement Cloud as DocuSign Guided Forms, powered by Intelledox.

Additional information
The SmartIQ (Intelledox) platform is available on-premise or in the cloud.

References

Software companies of Australia